Colin Hilton (26 September 1937 – 30 October 2015) was an English cricketer. He played for Lancashire between 1957 and 1963 and for Essex in 1964. He played  as a professional for Morecambe Cricket Club in the Northern Cricket League during 1968 and 1969, setting a league record of 113 wickets during the 1968 season; this record remains unbeaten.

References

External links

1937 births
2015 deaths
English cricketers
Essex cricketers
Lancashire cricketers
People from Atherton, Greater Manchester